Hyalina vallei is a species of sea snail, a marine gastropod mollusk in the family Marginellidae, the margin snails.

Distribution

It lives at a depth of 6 to 8 m in the Cayo La Grifa and Golfo de Batabanó off Cuba, as well as in waters off Costa Rica and the Bahamas.

References

External links
 Malacolog database entry

Marginellidae
Gastropods described in 2002